Tulosesus impatiens (formerly Coprinellus impatiens) is a species of fungus in the family Psathyrellaceae. First described in 1821, it has been classified variously in the genera Psathyrella, Pseudocoprinus, Coprinarius, and Coprinus, before molecular phylogenetics reaffirmed it as a Coprinellus species in 2001. The fungus is found in North America and Europe, where the mushrooms grow on the ground in deciduous forests. Several other Coprinopsis species that resemble C. impatiens may be distinguished by differences in appearance, habit, or spore morphology.

Taxonomy and phylogeny
The species was first described in 1821 as Agaricus impatiens by Swedish mycologist Elias Magnus Fries in his Systema Mycologicum. In 1886, Lucien Quélet transferred the species to Coprinarius (a defunct genus now synonymous with Panaeolus) and then to Coprinus a couple of years later in his Flore Mycologique de la France. In 1936, Robert Kühner segregated the genus Pseudocoprinus from Coprinus, including species that did not have deliquescent gills (that is, gills that "melt" into liquid), and he included Coprinus impatiens in this generic transfer. He later changed his mind about the taxonomic separation of Coprinus and Pseudocoprinus. Gillet transferred the species to Psathyrella in 1936. In 1938 Jakob Emanuel Lange published the new combination Coprinellus impatiens. Despite the taxonomic shuffling, the species was popularly known as Coprinus impatiens until 2001, when a large-scale phylogenetic analysis resulted in the splitting of the genus Coprinus into several smaller genera, and the authors confirmed the validity of the generic placement in Coprinellus. The specific epithet impatiens is derived from the Latin word for "impatient".

A 2005 phylogenetics study proposed that C. impatiens was sister (closely related  on the phylogenetic tree) to a large Psathyrella clade, and that consequently, the genus Coprinellus was polyphyletic. A later (2008) study suggested, however, that these results were due to an artifact of taxon sampling—not enough species were analyzed to adequately represent the genetic variation in the genera. The 2008 study demonstrated that Coprinellus, including C. impatiens, was monophyletic, descended from a common ancestor. In their analysis, C. impatiens was most closely related to C. congregatus, C. bisporus, C. callinus, and C. heterosetulosus.

The species was known as Coprinellus impatiens until 2020 when the German mycologists Dieter Wächter & Andreas Melzer reclassified many species in the Psathyrellaceae family based on phylogenetic analysis.

Description

It has deep narrow grooves reaching almost as far as the center of the cap. The surface color is a pale buff, tawny or cinnamon towards the center, but the color loses intensity when the mushroom is dry. The flesh is whitish, thin, fragile and barely deliquescent (auto-digesting). The gills are initially buff, then turn grayish brown. They are either free from attachment to the stem, or adnexed, meaning only a small portion of the gill is attached. The stem surface of young specimens are pruinose—appearing to be coated with a minute layer of fine white particles; this eventually is sloughed off, leaving a smooth or silky surface. The odor and taste of the fruit bodies are not distinctive. The gills of this species do not autodigest with age, or barely do so; the fruit bodies tend to become more fragile with age.

The spore print is dark brown. The spores are smooth, ellipsoid or almond-shaped, with a germ pore; they measure 9–12 by 5–6 μm. The spore-bearing cells, the basidia, are four-spored and tetramorphic (the spores lie on several different levels, and mature at different times). The cheilocystidia (cystidia found on the gill edge) are roughly spherical, 20–35 μm broad, or lageniform (flask-shaped), 36–64 by 10–15 μm, with the apex often rather acute, about 3–5 μm wide. Pleurocystidia (cystidia found on the gill face) are absent in this species.

Similar species

Coprinellus disseminatus resembles C. impatiens, but may be distinguished by its slightly larger fruit body, somewhat deliquescent gills, and tendency to fruit in smaller groups on the ground, rather than on or around rotting wood. Also, C. disseminatus has smaller spores than C. impatiens, typically 6.6–9.7 by 4.1–5.8 μm. C. eurysporus is similar to C. disseminatus but usually grows in groups on fallen branches, and has broader spores that measure 8.3–10.3 by 6.7–8.4 µm. C. hiascens usually grows in small dense clumps, has narrower spores (typically 9–11 by 4.5–5.5 μm, and produces smaller fruit bodies.

Habitat and distribution
Tulosesus impatiens is found in North America and Europe (including Germany, Poland, and Ukraine) including northern Turkey. In the Pacific Northwest region of the United States, it is found in Oregon and Idaho. Fruit bodies grow solitarily, or rarely in small bundles, on forest litter in deciduous forests, especially ones dominated by beech.

References

External links

Mushroom Observer Images

impatiens
Inedible fungi
Fungi described in 1821
Fungi of North America
Fungi of Europe
Taxa named by Elias Magnus Fries
Tulosesus